Filotije is a Serbian male given name, derived from the Greek name Philotheos. It may refer to:

Filotije, Metropolitan of Lim
Filotije, Metropolitan of Belgrade-Syrmia (1481)
Filotije Racanović (d. May 1751), Metropolitan of Herzegovina (1740-1751)
Filotije Banjac, Serbian Orthodox monk

See also
Filotijević
Filotić
Philotheos (disambiguation)

Serbian masculine given names